The Saloon Mecha Dragon is an upcoming compact executive electric sedan to be produced by Chinese car company Great Wall Motor under the Saloon premium brand. The Mecha Dragon is the first product of the Saloon brand and it was originally planned with an initial run of 101 units. Great Wall Motor plans to enter the luxury all-electric vehicle market with the Saloon brand offering a price range between ¥400,000 ($62,685) and ¥800,000 ($125,370).

Overview
Great Wall Motors unveiled its new premium brand Saloon or Shalong Auto (沙龙), together with its first model, the Mecha Dragon or Jijialong (机甲龙) in Chinese, at the 2021 Guangzhou Auto Show.

Battery specifications
The Mecha Dragon is equipped with Great Wall's Dayu battery pack with a capacity of 115kWh and 800-volt technology offering an  electric range according to China's light-duty vehicle test cycle (CLTC). With the 800V electrical architecture and a maximum DC fast-charging rate of 480 kW, the battery can add  of range within 10 minutes. Saloon also states that the Mecha Dragon can be wirelessly charged.

References

External links
 Official website

2020s cars
Cars of China
Cars introduced in 2021
Sports sedans
Production electric cars